Miloš Obilić was a legendary Serbian knight who is reputed to have been in the service of Prince Lazar during the Ottoman invasion of Serbia in the late 14th century. He is not mentioned in contemporary sources, but features prominently in later accounts of the 1389 Battle of Kosovo as the assassin of Sultan Murad. Although the assassin remains anonymous in sources until the late 15th century, the dissemination of the story of Murad's assassination in Florentine, Serbian, Ottoman and Greek sources suggests that versions of it circulated widely across the Balkans within half a century of the event.

It is not certain whether Obilić actually existed, but Lazar's family – strengthening their political control – "gave birth to the myth of Kosovo", including the story of Obilić. He became a major figure in Serbian epic poetry, in which he is elevated to the level of the most noble national hero of medieval Serbian folklore. Along with the martyrdom of Prince Lazar and the alleged treachery of Vuk Branković, Miloš's deed became an integral part of Serbian traditions surrounding the Battle of Kosovo. In the 19th century, Miloš also came to be venerated as a saint in the Serbian Church.

Miloš is also remembered in Kosovo Albanian epic poetry and his birth place is said to have been in the Drenica region

Name
Miloš is a Slavic given name recorded from the early Middle Ages among the Bulgarians, Czechs, Poles and Serbs. It is derived from the Slavic root mil-, meaning "merciful" or "dear", which is found in a great number of Slavic given names.

Several versions of the hero's surname have been used throughout history. In his History of Montenegro (1754), Vasilije Petrović wrote of one Miloš Obilijević, and in 1765, the historian Pavle Julinac rendered the surname as Obilić. According to Czech historian Konstantin Jireček, the surname Obilić and its different renderings are derived from the Serbian words obilan ("plenty of") and obilje ("wealth, abundance"). The surname Kobilić could come from the Slavic word kobila (mare), and means "mare's son", as in Serbian legends the hero is said to have been nursed by one. Jireček connected the surname to two noble families in medieval Ragusa and Trebinje, the Kobilić and Kobiljačić in the 14th and 15th centuries, and noted that they altered their surnames in the 18th century because they considered it "indecent" to be associated with mares. Based on a 1433 document from Ragusan archives, the historian Mihailo Dinić concluded that Miloš's original surname was indeed Kobilić. The rendering Obilić has universally been used by Serbian writers in modern times. In Albanian folklore he is known as Kopiliq  The root of the name 'Kopiliq' might be in an old Balkan substrat word, in Albanian kopil (child or bastard child), in Romanian copil (child) and in Serbian kopile (bastard child) or kobila (mare, from which kobilić, son of the mare).

Miloš is often referred to in the epic poems as "Miloš of Pocerje", and according to local legends, he came from the western Serbian region of Pocerina. In Pocerina there is a spring known as "Miloševa Banja" (Miloš's spring) and an old grave that is claimed to be the grave of Miloš's sister.

Earliest sources
The earliest sources on the Battle of Kosovo, which generally favour the cult of Prince Lazar, do not mention Miloš or his assassination of the sultan. The assassination itself is first recorded by Deacon Ignjatije on 9 July 1389, only 12 days after the battle. The assassination of sultan Murad and one of his sons was also mentioned in the instructions of the Venetian Senate issued to Andrea Bembo on 23 July 1389, although Venetians were uncertain if news about the assassination were true. On 1 August 1389 King Tvrtko I of Bosnia (r. 1353-1391) wrote a letter to Trogir to inform its citizens about Ottoman defeat. Victory over the Turks was also reported by Coluccio Salutati (died 1406), Chancellor of Florence, in his letter to King Tvrtko, dated 20 October 1389, on behalf of the Florentine Senate. The killer is not named but he is described as one of twelve Christian noblemen who managed to break through the Ottoman ranks:

"Fortunate, most fortunate are those hands of the twelve loyal lords who, having opened their way with the sword and having penetrated the enemy lines and the circle of chained camels, heroically reached the tent of Amurat [Murad] himself. Fortunate above all is that one who so forcefully killed such a strong vojvoda by stabbing him with a sword in the throat and belly. And blessed are all those who gave their lives and blood through the glorious manner of martyrdom as victims of the dead leader over his ugly corpse."

Another Italian account, Mignanelli's 1416 work, asserted that it was Lazar who killed the Ottoman sultan.

The assassin's first appearance in Serbian sources is in the biography of Stefan Lazarević, Lazar's son, by Constantine the Philosopher, written in the 1440s. The hero, still anonymous, is described as a man of noble birth whom envious tongues had sought to defame before the prince. To prove his loyalty and courage, he left the front line on the pretext of being a deserter, seized the opportunity to stab the sultan to death and was killed himself shortly afterwards. The initial phase of ignominy and its redemption by a courageous plot of slaying the sultan are narrative ingredients which would become essential to the Serbian legend as it evolved in later times.

Ottoman and Greek sources

The loss of the Sultan also made an impression on the earliest Ottoman sources. They usually describe how Murad was unaccompanied on the battlefield and an anonymous Christian who had been lying among the corpses stabbed him to death. In the early 15th century, for instance, the poet Ahmedi writes that "[s]uddenly one of the Christians, who was covered in blood and apparently hidden among the enemy dead, got up, rushed to Murad and stabbed him with a dagger."

Halil İnalcık explained that one of the most important contemporary Ottomans sources about the Battle of Kosovo is the 1465 work of Enveri. İnalcık argued that it was based on the testimony of a contemporary eyewitness of the battle, probably Hoca Omer, an envoy sent by the Sultan to Lazar before the battle. In this work Enveri explains that before he became a Serbian nobleman, Miloš (Miloš Ban is how İnalcık rendered the name in Enveri's text) was a Muslim at the Sultan's court who deserted Ottomans and abjured Islam. The Sultan allegedly called him to return to his service many times. Enveri explains that although Miloš always promised to return, he never did. According to this account, when Lazar was captured, Miloš approached the Sultan who was riding a black stallion and said: "I am Miloš Ban, I want to go back to my Islamic faith and kiss your hand." When Miloš came close to the Sultan, he struck him with the dagger hidden in his cuff. The Sultan's men cut Miloš into pieces with swords and axes.

One historian from Edirne, Oruc Bey, explains the lack of protection by saying that the army was preoccupied with pursuing the enemy in rear flight and introduces an element of deception: the Christian "had promised himself as a sacrifice and approached Murad, who was sitting alone on his horse. Pretending he wished to kiss the Sultan's hand, he stabbed the Sultan with a sharp dagger."

Since about the late 15th century, Greek sources also begin to record the event. The Athenian scholar Laonicus Chalcocondyles (d. c. 1490) claims to draw on Greek traditions when he refers to Murad's killer as Miloes, "a man of noble birth [... who] voluntarily decided to accomplish the heroic act of assassination. He requested what he needed from Prince Lazar, and then rode off to Murad's camp with the intention of presenting himself as a deserter. Murad, who was standing in the midst of his troops before the battle, was eager to receive the deserter. Miloes reached the Sultan and his bodyguards, turned his spear against Murad, and killed him." Writing in the second half of the same century, Michael Doukas regarded the story as worthy of inclusion in his Historia Byzantina. He relates how the young nobleman pretended to desert the battle, was captured by the Turks and professing to know the key to victory, managed to gain access to Murad and kill him.

In 1976, Miodrag Popović suggested that the narrative elements of secrecy and stratagem in the Serbian tradition were all introduced from Turkish sources, seeking to defame the capabilities of their Christian opponents by attributing the death of the Murat to "devious" methods. Thomas A. Emmert agrees with him.

Emmert says that Turkish sources mentioned the assassination several times, while Western and Serbian sources didn't mention it until much later. He thinks that Serbians knew about the assassination, but decided not to mention it in their first accounts for unknown reasons.

In 1512 Ottoman historian Mehmed Nesri wrote a detailed account of the battle that became the source for later Ottoman and Western descriptions of the battle. Nesri's account took several elements from popular Serbian tradition, and described the assassination in a way which reflected negatively on the perpetrators.

Serbian traditions
Miloš Obilić is a major hero of the Serbian legend of Kosovo, whose central part is the Battle of Kosovo. According to the legend, Miloš was a son-in-law of the Serbian Prince Lazar. A quarrel broke out between his wife and her sister who was married to Vuk Branković, about superiority in valour of their respective husbands. As a consequence of this, Branković took offence and picked a fight with Miloš. Filled with hate, Branković maligned Miloš to Lazar, saying that he conspired with Turks to betray the prince. At Lazar's supper on the eve of the battle, the prince reproached Miloš for disloyalty. To prove his loyalty, Miloš went into the Turkish camp feigning defection. At a favourable moment, he stabbed and killed the Turkish Sultan Murad, whose attendants then executed Miloš. The legend then goes on to describe events regarding the battle.

There are two main views about the creation of the Kosovo legend. In one view, its place of origin lies in the region in which the Battle of Kosovo was fought. In the other view, the legend sprang up in more westerly Balkan regions under the influence of the French chansons de geste. Serbian philologist Dragutin Kostić stated that the French chivalric epics had in fact no part in the formation of the legend, but that they "only modified the already created and formed legend and its first poetic manifestations". The nucleus from which the legend developed is found in the cultic literature celebrating Prince Lazar as a martyr and saint, written in Moravian Serbia between 1389 and 1420. Especially important in this regard is the Discourse on Prince Lazar composed by Serbian Patriarch Danilo III. The legend would gradually evolve during the subsequent centuries.

The tale of the maligned hero who penetrated the Turkish camp and killed Sultan Murad, is found in the Life of Despot Stefan Lazarević written in the 1430s by Konstantin the Philosopher. The hero's name is not mentioned in this work. The theme of the quarrel between Lazar's sons-in-law was first recorded in Herzegovina in the mid-15th century. Lazar's supper on the eve of the battle and his reproach of Miloš are mentioned in texts from the 16th century. The argument between Lazar's daughters over the valor of their husbands was first recorded by Mavro Orbin in 1601. The fully developed legend of Kosovo, with all of its elements, is recorded in the Tale of the Battle of Kosovo composed around the beginning of the 18th century in the Bay of Kotor or Old Montenegro. This was a very popular text, whose copies were continuously produced for some 150 years in an area stretching from the south of ex-Yugoslavia to Budapest and Sofia. The Tale played a notable role in the awakening of national consciousness of the Serbs in the Habsburg monarchy, which began in the first half of the 18th century.

The first author to refer to Murad's killer by his full name is Konstantin Mihailović, a Serbian Janissary from the village of Ostrovica, near Rudnik, who wrote his Memoirs of a Janissary or Turkish Chronicle in ca 1497. In a passage intended to infer a moral lesson about disloyalty from the Serbian defeat at Kosovo, Mihailović identifies Miloš Kobica as the knight who on the fateful last Friday of the battle slew Murad. The next time a name is given in the sources is three decades later, in 1530, when the (Slovene) monk Benedikt Kuripečič (Curipeschitz) wrote memoirs of his travels through the Balkan Peninsula. His visit to Murad's tomb in Kosovo Polje provides the occasion for the story of the knight whom he names Miloš Kobilović. Kuripešić elaborates on the humiliation and fall out favour which Miloš endured before the battle, his last dinner with Lazar and his nobles, his admittance to Murad's tent, the brutal murder and his own death on attempting to escape on horseback. The monk, though not explicit about his sources, writes that Miloš was a celebrated figure in the popular traditions of Serbs, who sing about his heroic exploits on the border. He recorded some legends about the Battle of Kosovo and mentions epic songs about Obilić in regions far from Kosovo, like Bosnia and Croatia. In his 1603 work Richard Knolles described the "country songs" of Serbs about the Battle of Kosovo and refer to Obilić as "Cobelitz".

In Serbian epic poetry and song (e.g. "Radul-bey and Bulgarian King Šišman" and the song "Dušan's Wedding"), Miloš Obilić is often grouped along with other literary creations like Karadjordje, Vuk Karadžić and Njegoš as Serbs of Dinaric origin who distinguished themselves as the great moral and/or intellectual minds of the past in contradistinction to Bulgarian contemporaries, who could claim no such status. In the poem "Obilić Dragon's Son", Miloš is given a mythical ancestry as the son of a dragon to emphasise his superhuman strength on a physical and spiritual level; in this, he joins the ranks of many other heroes of Serbian poetry who fought against Turkish oppression and are claimed to have been descendants of a dragon.

Legacy

It was not until the early 19th century that Miloš was also venerated as a saint in the Serbian Church. During the Serbian Revolution (1804–1815), a fresco of Miloš as a haloed, sword-bearing saint was painted in Prince Lazar's narthex in the Hilandar Monastery on Mount Athos (Greece). The historian Rade Mihaljčić suggests that the cult was a popular movement which originated among the Serbs south of the Sava and Danube during the Ottoman period.

Later in the same century, the heroic figure of Miloš was given a national boost in the epic poem The Mountain Wreath (1847) by Petar II Petrović-Njegoš, prince-bishop of Montenegro. The poem praises the assassin's valour in battle, calling him "the victim of a noble feeling, / An all powerful military genius, / A dreadful thunder that smashes crowns". Njegoš also instituted the Obilić medal for courage.

This event and the Battle of Kosovo itself has become embedded in the Serbs' national consciousness, history, and poetry. Njegoš's tales, including Miloš, inspired later generations of Serbs – notably Gavrilo Princip, the assassin of Archduke Franz Ferdinand.

In 1913, the Medal of Miloš Obilić was awarded by King Peter I to soldiers for the acts of great personal courage, or for personal courage demonstrated on the battlefield. It was given during the Balkan wars, World War I, and during World War II, to members of the Yugoslav Army or allied forces and was discontinued with the end of the war.

In the late 1980s, religious nationalists began to breathe further life into the figure of Miloš and the Kosovo Myth. Special inspiration was taken from Njegoš's The Mountain Wreath, with its portrayal of Lazar as a Christ-like martyr and Obilić as the Serb sacrificing himself to prove his loyalty and seek retribution. A key event which gave expression to this idea was the 600th anniversary of the Battle of Kosovo (Vidovdan) on 28 June 1989, which was held at the Gazimestan plain, near the site of the battle. Obilić's feat has been cited as a source of inspiration in public speeches by political leaders, notably President Milošević, who referred to him in his Gazimestan speech on the occasion of the battle anniversary. His regime often alluded to Obilić frequently in comparison to Milosević, who was proclaimed the "saviour of the nation".

Obilić is featured in Serbian rhymical idiom "Dva loša ubiše Miloša" or "Dva su loša ubila Miloša" which translates as "Two no-goods have killed Miloš". The idiom addresses the issue of quantity prevailing over quality as a sad fact of life, since Obilić was outnumbered by the enemies.

In Serbian epic poetry, there are several blood brotherhoods. Miloš Obilić with Milan Toplica and Ivan Kosančić, Miloš Obilić with Prince Marko, Miloš Obilić with the Jugović brothers.

He is included in The 100 most prominent Serbs.

See also

 Battle of Kosovo
 List of Serbs
 History of Serbia
 Lazar of Serbia

Annotations

References

Notes:

References:

Sources
 
  Reproduced online at De Re Militari. The Society for Medieval Military History.

Further reading
Primary sources
Deacon Ignjatije wrote a description of the battle on 27 June 1389, only 12 days after the battle.
The instructions of the Venetian Senate issued to Andrea Bembo on 23 July 1389.
King Tvrtko I of Bosnia sent a letter with information about Ottoman defeat to Trogir on 1 August 1389 "Monumenta spectantia historiam Slavorum meridionalium", p.48
Coluccio Salutati (chancellor of Florence, died 1406) wrote a letter to King Tvrtko on 20 October 1389.
anonymous Florentine Chronicle, ed. L.A. Muratori, Cronica Volgare di Anonimo Fiorentino dall' anno 1385 al 1409. Rerum Italicarum Scriptores vol. 17, fasc. 152. Citta di Castello, 1917. pp. 77–9.
Bertrando de Mignanelli of Siena, Life of Tamerlane (Timur) (1416)
Constantine the Philosopher, Life of Despot Stefan Lazarević (written 1440s)
Konstantin Mihailović (15th century), Memoirs of a Janissary (or Turkish Chronicle) written in period 1490—1501
Ludovik Crijević Tuberon (written before 1527)
Benedict Kuripešić, Travel memoirs (written 1530)
Ottoman sources
the poet Ahmedi (early 15th century), ed. A. Olesnicki, Turski izvori o Kosovskom boju., Glasnik skopskog naucnog drustva 14 (1934): 60–2. 
Uruc, historian
Greek sources
Laonicus Chalcocondyles (late 15th century)
Doukas (mid 15th century)
Later narrations
 
 
Richard Knolles, The Generall Historie of the Turkes (1603)
Drama Milos Obilic (1826)
Petar II Petrović-Njegoš, The Mountain Wreath (written 1847)

Secondary sources
 
 Ivanova, Radost (1993). "The Problem of the Historical Approach in the Epic Songs of the Kosovo Cycle." Études balkaniques 4: 111–22.
 Khan, Mujeeb R. (1996) "The 'Other' in the Balkans. Historical constructions of Serbs and 'Turks'." Journal of Muslim Minority Affairs 16.
 Kostic, Dragutin (1934–1935). "Milos Kopilic-Kobilic-Obilic." Revue Internationale des Etudes Balkaniques 1–2: 232–54. A study of Miloš Obilić's name.
 Mihaljcic, Rade (1989). The Battle of Kosovo. Belgrade.
 Мирослав Пантић, "Кнез Лазар и косовска битка у старој књижевности Дубровника и Боке Которске", Зборник радова о кнезу Лазару, Београд, 1975

14th-century Serbian nobility
Medieval Serbian military personnel
Serbian knights
Serbian assassins
Medieval assassins
Characters in Serbian epic poetry
Eastern Orthodox Christians from Serbia
Members of the Serbian Orthodox Church
Assassins of heads of state
Regicides
Heroes in mythology and legend
History of Kosovo
Year of birth unknown
1389 deaths
14th-century murderers